Magnolia sinica is a species of flowering plant in the family Magnoliaceae, native to southeast Yunnan province, China. It is categorized as Critically Endangered. There are an estimated 50 wild individuals remaining. As it is a tree reaching  with a straight trunk, it is subject to logging pressure.

References

sinica
Endemic flora of Yunnan
Plants described in 1985